Friars Walk is a partially under-cover shopping centre and leisure complex in Newport city centre, South Wales. It has several levels and includes a range of high street shops, eateries, a cinema, a bowling alley and a soft play area. The complex is linked by the redeveloped John Frost Square to the Kingsway Shopping Centre, Newport Museum, Art Gallery and Central Library and Newport bus station. The complex is a short walk from the high street shops of Commercial Street and High Street. Newport railway station is also a short walk away.

The Friars Walk car park holds 350 cars and over 1,000 spaces are available in the adjacent Kingsway multi-storey car park, both accessed from the A4042 Kingsway. There are cycle racks located in Usk Plaza.

Development
The original plans by Modus Corovest were scrapped in 2009, because of the 2008 financial crisis but revived in a £100 million scheme by Queensberry Real Estate in 2012. Plans included a six-screen cinema, ten pin bowling alley, eight restaurants and a 350 space carpark. A new bus station was also included, with finance coming from a £90 million loan from Newport City Council.

The new design was by Leslie Jones Architecture. Construction began in April 2014. The scheme opened on 12 November 2015, raising Newport from 200th to 77th in the UK's retail rankings and heralded as a "lifeline for Newport". The total cost came to £117 million.

In June 2017, the site's developer Queensberry Real Estate sold the centre to Talisker Corporation, the Canadian owner of Main Square in Toronto, and Canyons Resort in Park City, Utah.

Stores
As of January 2022, retailers include:

 Next
 Mabboo
 H&M
 EE
 River Island
 Damaged Society
 Holland & Barrett
 Sin City Comics
 New Look
 Sketchers
 Tin Shed Theatre
 JD Sports
 Fabrix
 Smiggle
 Pandora
 Vodafone
 Super Bowl
 Singar Beauty
 Jeffries
 New Pastures Home

Food and drink services include:
 Coffee Corner
 Greggs
 M&S Foodhall
 Coffee No 1
 KFC
 Tawa Indian Buffett
 Taco Bell
 Nando's
 Las Iguanas
 Drago Lounge
 Zizzi
 Le Bistrot Pierre
 Wagamamas
 Prezzo
 Costa
 Smokd
 TGI Friday's
 Bar Piazza

Chartist Steps
The steps connecting Usk Plaza to John Frost Square are inscribed with the six points of the People's Charter to commemorate the Chartist movement and the Newport Rising of 1839 led by John Frost.

Gallery of Friars Walk

References

Shopping in Newport, Wales
Shopping centres in Wales
Commercial buildings completed in 2015